In response to the loss of the strategic al-Faw Peninsula during the Iran–Iraq War, the Iraqis pushed into Iran to seize the strategic Iranian city of Mehran to trade for the strategically important territory. Saddam was able to seize the city in May 1986, for the third time. He then offered to trade it for al-Faw, but instead of negotiating, the Iranians recaptured the city in June 1986.

Background

On February 10, 1986 Iran launched a successful surprise amphibious assault, (what became known as the first Battle of Al-Faw), across the Shatt al-Arab (Arvand rud in Persian) waterway and seized the strategic al-Faw Peninsula. The Iraqi units in charge of the defenses were mostly made up of poorly trained Iraqi Popular Army conscripts that collapsed when they were suddenly attacked by the Iranian Pasdaran (Revolutionary Guard) forces.

The battle

Immediately after the Iranian capture of Al-Faw, Saddam declared a new offensive against Iran, Al Defa Al Muthaharraka (Arabic for The Dynamic Defense), designed to drive deep into Iran. The Iranian border city of Mehran, Ilam Province on the foot of the Zagros Mountains was selected as the first target. This city was situated on an important road leading into Iran. On May 15–19 the Iraqi Army's II Corps supported by helicopter gunships captured the city. Saddam then offered the Iranians to exchange Mehran for Al-Faw. The Iranians rejected the Iraqi offer. Iraq then continued the attack attempting to push deeper into Iran. However, Iraq's attack was quickly smashed by Iranian AH-1 Cobra helicopters with TOW missiles destroying an unspecified amount of Iraqi tanks and vehicles.

Iranian troops using mountain warfare built up their forces on the heights surrounding the city. On June 30, they launched Operation Karbala 1, recapturing the area by July 3. Saddam ordered the Republican Guard to retake the city on July 4, but their attack was thoroughly defeated. The Iraqi losses were so heavy the Iranians managed to capture some territory inside of Iraq as well.  Iraq's defeats at al-Faw and at Mehran was a severe blow to the prestige of the Iraqi regime. The western powers including the U.S. also became more determined to prevent an Iraqi loss.

Aftermath
After the defeat, Saddam and the Baath Party held an "Extraordinary Congress" and decided on a full mobilization of the Iraqi Popular Army.  Enlisting men as old as 42, the regime initiated a total call-up of available manpower in 1986. At the time the government feared that calls for the mobilization would lead to draft riots, but the response was good: young men – even college students – reported without incident. The fact that the public answered the call, indicated that Iraqis feared invasion during the war.

Order of battle

Iraq

Iraqi Army
2nd Corps
17th Armored Division
70th Armored Brigade
59th Armored Brigade
705th Infantry Brigade
433rd, 417th, 425th Infantry Brigades
1st Commando Brigade, Commando Battalion of the 40th Infantry Division

Reinforcements sent:

Republican Guard
1st Mechanized
4th and 5th Infantry Brigades
3rd Special Forces Brigade
2nd and 10th Armored Brigades
Iraqi Army
35th Infantry Division
71st, 72nd, 3rd Infantry Brigades
501st, 113th, 95th, 118th, and 108th Infantry Brigades
24th Mechanized Brigade
2nd, 3rd, and 5th Commando Brigades, Commando Battalion of the 20th Infantry Division, Commando Battalion of the 2nd Infantry Division
65th Special Forces Brigade
763rd, 110th, 15th, 766th, 217th, 238th, 53rd, 247th, and 489th Artillery Battalions

Iran

Najaf Headquarters
Commanded by Mostafa Izadi
27th Muhammad Rasulullah Division
6 infantry battalions, 1 tank battalion
17th Ali ibn Abi Talib Division
Commanded by Gholamreza Jaafari
3 infantry battalions, 1 tank battalion
5th Nasr Division
3 infantry battalions
25th Karbala Division
Commanded by Morteza Ghorbani
4 infantry battalions, 1 tank battalion
10th Sayyed-osh-Shohada Division
3 infantry battalions
41st Sarallah Division
Commanded by Qassem Soleimani
4 infantry battalions, 1 tank battalion
21st Imam Reza Independent Brigade
2 infantry battalions
15th Imam Hassan Independent Brigade
5 infantry battalions
662nd Beit-ol-Moqaddas Independent Brigade
2 infantry battalions
38th Zolfaghar Independent Armored Battalion
1 tank company
2 artillery battalions from IRGC, 4 artillery battalions from Army
Islamic Republic of Iran Army Aviation

See also
 First Battle of al-Faw
 Republican Guard (Iraq)

References

Military operations of the Iran–Iraq War in 1986
History of Ilam Province
Operations Karbala